Narayani was one of the fourteen zones of Nepal until the restructuring of zones to Provinces, located in the central south of the country. The headquarter of Narayani zone was Hetauda. Narayani Zone is named after the Narayani River which is on the western border of the zone, separating it from the Gandaki and Lumbini zones. Narayani means beloved of Narayan which is Parvati his sister, and Narayan refers to Lord Vishnu (the preserver) in the Hindu religion.

Geography 
Narayani contained parts of the Terai, Inner Terai, and Hill regions of Nepal, but it did not contain any of the Mountain or Himalayan region. Narayani is rich in flora and fauna. Considering the plain Terai, bordering India (to the south), where arnas (wild bulls) run to the hills from in fall, landscape structure of Narayani can be considered unique. Narayani River and East Rapti River are the main rivers of Narayani zone. Bishajari and Garuda are some of the few lakes in Narayani.

Administrative subdivisions 
Narayani was divided into five districts; since 2015 the two northern districts have been redesignated as part of Bagmati Province, while the three southern districts have been redesignated as part of Province No. 2.

History 
Narayani used to be all forest. Settlement started after the Anglo-Nepal War. Devghat, where people go for meditation, is in this area. It is one of the most religious places of Nepal.

Economy 
Birgunj-Pathlaiya 25 km industrial corridor having major industries of Nepal is in Narayani zone. 
It is the third largest industrial area of the country. Hetauda is the industrial area where the Hetauda cement factory (government owned organization) is. The main transit point of business transaction is in Birgunj joining to Raxaul, India, a dry port of Nepal and India.

Nepal Oil Corporation in Amlekhganj, Dabur Nepal in Bara District, Unilever in Hetauda, Bottlers Nepal (Terai) in Chitwan and other several industries are in Narayani Zone and play leading role in national economy.

Important cities and towns 
Some important cities and towns are Birganj, Parwanipur, Jitpur, Alau, Hetauda, Bharatpur, Narayangarh, Kalaiya, and Gaur.

Miscellaneous 
Narayani hosts Nepal's oldest and most famous national park: Chitwan National Park (932 km²), considered to be one of Asia's richest nature reserves, renowned for its Bengal tigers and the Indian rhinoceros. To the southeast the park is complemented by the Parsa National Park with another 499 km².

As of 2014 the Zone now hosts the beauty contest of Miss Glam Narayani, wherein winners are given direct entry to Miss Glam Nepal.

Narayani is one of the few zones that was left relatively untouched by the Maoist insurgency. It is a relatively prosperous zones of Nepal with a trading market with India whose effect can be easily seen in the border town of Birgunj, the capital of this zone.

See also
 Development Regions of Nepal
 List of zones of Nepal
 List of districts of Nepal

 
Zones of Nepal
2015 disestablishments in Nepal